is a fictional character in the Street Fighter fighting game franchise by Capcom, where she made her first appearance in 1995's Street Fighter Alpha as the third female fighter of the game series, after Chun-Li and Cammy. In the games, she is a fortune teller who wields a pure energy known as Soul Power.

Appearances

In video games
Rose first appears in Street Fighter Alpha, characterized as a mystic fortune teller from Genoa, Italy, who searches the world for M. Bison to eradicate his evil power with her unique ability, known as Soul Power. At the end of the game, Rose engages Bison in combat and seems to kill him. In the ending of Street Fighter Alpha 2, however, she consults her tarot cards and learns that Bison survived.

At the climax of Street Fighter Alpha 3, Rose faces Bison once more and rams her fist through his chest, channeling her energy into his body. As Bison grapples with Rose, he reveals that they both share half of "the same soul". In the end, Bison's physical form evaporates and Rose collapses from exhaustion. Soon after, Guy recovers her and takes her to safety. Although it appears as if Bison has been killed, he has transferred his consciousness into Rose, effectively claiming her body. In the period between the Alpha series and Street Fighter II: The World Warrior, Bison remains inside Rose's body until his scientists can form a new (albeit weaker) one for him. Bison appears as the final boss of Street Fighter II. The Street Fighter IV Training Guide reveals that Rose survived the possession but has no memory of it.

Rose returns in the home versions of Street Fighter IV as an additional character, voiced by Gina Grad. Her purpose is to track down Bison and stop him for good after learning that he has survived Akuma's attack at the end of the second World Warrior tournament. While competing in the tournament, she runs into Ryu. She is determined to halt his advancement for his own protection, saying that he is "the last hope", and they reluctantly fight. In her ending, she is confronted by Bison, who takes his remaining power back from her, causing her to fall to the ground unconscious. As Bison stands over her, he declares his intention to keep her alive to satisfy his soul. The situation is resolved in Guy's ending of Super Street Fighter IV, when Guy rescues Rose from Bison as he attempts to flee with her. Rose appears as a playable character in the fifth season of Street Fighter V, where she has taken on a new apprentice, Menat.

Rose appears in Namco × Capcom, first as an enemy unit, being made to serve Black Valkyrie from Valkyrie no Densetsu via soul contract alongside Armor King from Tekken, then as a fully playable ally, after Heihachi Mishima arrives with the Golden Seed, giving it to Valkyrie who then uses it to allow their souls to escape; after being freed, Rose attempts to use her Soul Power to stop M. Bison and joins the party for the rest of the game. She is also a playable character in Capcom Fighting Evolution, and a boss in Street Fighter X Mega Man.

Design
Rose was inspired by JoJo's Bizarre Adventure character Lisa Lisa. Rose's outfit is almost identical to Lisa Lisa's and both share a similar fighting style that consists of channeling energy into their scarfs (Soul Power in the case of Rose and Ripple in the case of Lisa Lisa). Additionally, both characters like to take baths .

In other media
Rose makes a cameo appearance in an episode of the first season of the American Street Fighter cartoon series ("The Medium is the Message") as a competitor in a Street Fighter tournament in India among other Street Fighter Alpha characters. She has a more prominent role in the second-season episode "The Flame and the Rose", where she teams up with Ken and Blanka to fight against Bison.

Rose also plays a major role in the 1995 manga adaptation of Street Fighter Alpha by Masahiko Nakahira, where she is a soothsayer who guides Ryu in his quest to control the Dark Hadou. She plays a similar role in the 1999 Street Fighter Alpha: The Movie OVA.

Rose appears in Street Fighter: The Legend of Chun-Li played by Elizaveta Kiryukhina as M. Bison's ulterior objective in the story, having sought her in Bangkok, where she was left after her mother died. As in the games, she is depicted as the manifestation of M. Bison's good side, though she is born instead of created, making her M. Bison's daughter. For safety reasons, she is alternatively referred to as the "White Rose" to hide her identity. Because she has lived her entire life in Bangkok, she is incapable of speaking English. 
In the movie's deleted scenes, there is a part where she is confronted by Nash and her eyes turn red, meaning that she was likely meant to be possessed by M. Bison as she was in the games. 

In the Street Fighter comics by UDON in close collaboration with Capcom, it is told that Rose was a member of a tribe of Roma (a.k.a. Gypsies) that followed a white haired woman known only as Master. The woman had a glowing yellow lightning bolt on her forehead and a very similar hairstyle to Rose. When Rose was a child (roughly ten years of age), M. Bison, a former student of the Master, returned to the tribe and declared that he was going to kill Master, as her knowledge of Soul Power was a threat to him. Though Master fought bravely, Bison's Psycho Power (corrupted Soul Power) ultimately killed her and almost every other person present in the village. Only a man who was away chopping wood away from the village survived. He returned after the explosion and discovered an unconscious Rose who now bore Master's Lightning bolt on her forehead (events in Street Fighter II #1). In Street Fighter #2, Cammy was tracking Ken and Ryu in San Francisco where she was intercepted by Rose. Later, Rose completely cleansed Cammy of the Psycho Power's influence and erased her brainwashing. She later deposited Cammy on the doorstep of the British Embassy in Italy where her instinctual response to a terrorist attack directly led to her being recruited to Delta Red, the organization she works for in Super Street Fighter II. Rose is distressed when Cammy, under the employ of MI5, not only returns to a life of violence but also engages in missions that will inevitably lead her back to Bison. At the conclusion of the Street Fighter II line of comics (issue #6), Rose directly confronts Bison (alongside Cammy) and attempts to finally put an end to him. However, he overpowers her with ease and ends up sapping her of her life force. Rose's body dies but her soul continues to live on and comes to haunt Bison in the following comic series (based on Street Fighter II Turbo).

Reception
IGN featured Rose in their 2008 list of top Street Fighter fighters as the 20th-best character in the franchise, praising her "pretty unique gameplay experience." Rose placed 29th on the 2010 list of top Street Fighter character by UGO.com, who called her "arguably the strongest female character in the series." In 2015, Digital Spy ranked Rose as the seventh-best character in the series for her "fascinating" backstory and for being "so bloody good in the right hands" in Alpha. In 2016, Screen Rant named Rose the sixth-most powerful Street Fighter character. In an official poll by Namco, Rose has been the 11th-most requested Street Fighter character to be added to the roster of Tekken X Street Fighter. Japanese Street Fighter IV players, however, ranked Rose as the hardest or least useful character in the game's original edition. In a 2018 worldwide poll by Capcom, Rose was voted 23rd most popular Street Fighter character (out of 109).

GameDaily included her in two lists of their "Babe of the Week" feature, including in the gallery "Hot, But Annoying", and in an individual gallery titled "Rose", commenting on the fact Rose does not need to show her cleavage to look sexy. Lisa Foiles of The Escapist included Rose on her list of five most impractical female hairstyles in games and Hardcore Gamer described Tessa from Red Earth as "essentially an interesting variant of Rose."

See also
List of Street Fighter characters

References

External links 
 Rose's profile at Street Fighter IV official website 
 Rose's Street Fighter Alpha and Street Fighter IV entries at StrategyWiki.org

Action film characters
Female characters in anime and manga
Female characters in video games
Fictional Romani people
Fictional fortune tellers
Fictional Italian people in video games
Street Fighter characters
Video game characters introduced in 1995
Video game characters with electric or magnetic abilities
Fictional characters who can duplicate themselves
Woman soldier and warrior characters in video games
Capcom protagonists